Stilboma is a genus of beetles in the subtribe Pericalina of the family Carabidae, containing the following species:

 Stilboma smaragdus Andrewes, 1933
 Stilboma viridis Andrewes, 1933

References

Lebiinae